Self-described as "Part band, part art collective." They reject the "rock band" label, Lane Czaplinski, artistic director of On the Boards remarks, "If they are not rock musicians, "there is rock payoff." Czaplinski has compared them to Polyphonic Spree

"Awesome" began as a cabaret act thrown together by seven experienced fringe theater actors.
Although they continued to perform in theatrical venues, their identity as a band and cabaret act has eclipsed their status as actors. Around October 2003, several future members of "Awesome" played together in a They Might Be Giants tribute to raise money for Seattle's Open Circle Theater. Their very first performance under the name "Awesome" (with just Ackermann, Mosher, Nixon, and Osebold) was in Seattle at Annex Theater's monthly cabaret "Spin the Bottle" On February 6, 2004, and their first full-septet performance as "Awesome" was in the Jewelbox theater at Belltown bar the Rendezvous on June 30, 2004. Their first major production was Delaware (first a multi-media stage production and later an album).  Gigs as a band have included performing on bills with Harvey Danger, A. C. Newman, U.S.E., The Presidents of the United States of America, and The Long Winters.

Band member David Nixon is a philosophy professor at the University of Washington, Bothell.

Band member Rob Pro (accordion, clarinet) is a composer and sound designer for theater productions.

Many of the group's theatrical pieces are non-narrative or have only minimal, non-linear narratives. For example, No Signal (2006) was described by Seattle Times reviewer Brangien Davis as "addressing, among other topics, technical difficulties, recurring dreams, cell death, regeneration and bees."

References

External links

 "Awesome" website
 Review of Dempster Diving, Earshot Jazz

Musical groups from Seattle